The 1984 Grand Prix de Tennis de Toulouse was a men's tennis tournament played on indoor carpet courts in Toulouse, France that was part of the Regular Series of the 1984 Grand Prix tennis circuit. It was the third edition of the tournament and was held from 19 November – 25 November.

Seeds
Champion seeds are indicated in bold text while text in italics indicates the round in which those seeds were eliminated.

Draw

Finals

Top half

Bottom half

References

Singles
Grand Prix de Tennis de Toulouse